Sylvester Douglas, 1st Baron Glenbervie, PC, KC, FRS, FRSE, FSA (24 May 1743 – 2 May 1823) was a British lawyer, politician and diarist. He was Chief Secretary for Ireland between 1793 and 1794.

Background, education and legal career
He was the son of John Douglas, descended from James Douglas, minister of Glenbervie in Aberdeenshire, son of Sir Archibald Douglas and half-brother of William Douglas, 9th Earl of Angus. His mother was Margaret Gordon, daughter and co-heir of James Gordon, of Fechel. His sister Katherine married James Mercer, army officer and poet.

Douglas was educated at the University of Aberdeen, graduating MA in 1765 and then studied both Law and Medicine at  the University of Leyden. He was admitted to Lincoln's Inn in London in 1771, was called to the Bar in 1776, and became King's Counsel in 1793.

Political career
The same year he was appointed a King's Counsel Douglas gave up his legal career on his appointment as Chief Secretary for Ireland under William Pitt the Younger. In 1794 he was admitted to both the Irish and English Privy Council and returned to the Irish House of Commons for St Canice, a seat he held until 1796. In 1795 he was elected to the British House of Commons for Fowey. He later represented Midhurst between 1796 and 1800, Plympton Erle between 1801 and 1802 and Hastings between 1802 and 1806.

He was asked to accompany Earl Macartney to the Cape of Good Hope in 1796 and, after 18 months there, to succeed him as governor. His wife did not like the idea and he declined the offer, even though an Irish peerage had also been offered. In 1797 Douglas was made a Lord of the Treasury by Pitt, In 1800 Douglas was asked for a second time to go to the Cape as governor. He finally agreed in October 1800, again for an Irish peerage and was so appointed Governor of the Cape of Good Hope, Douglas changed his mind again and accepted a post as Joint Paymaster of HM Forces, subsequently receiving £2731. 10s. in salary, paid from the Cape Treasury, even though he never went there. At the end of the year on 29 November 1800 he was created Baron Glenbervie, of Kincardine, in Scotland.

After serving as joint Paymaster of the Forces between 1801 and 1803 and Vice-President of the Board of Trade between 1801 and 1804, he was Surveyor General of Woods, Forests, Parks, and Chases between 1803 and 1806 and 1807 and 1810. On the office of the Surveyor General of the Land Revenues of the Crown being combined with the former in 1810, became the First Commissioner of Woods and Forests, the head of the new department. He held the office until 1814.

Lord Glenbervie was also Rector of King's College, Aberdeen between 1805 and 1814.

Personal life
In 1789 Lord Glenbervie married Lady Catherine Anne, eldest daughter of Frederick North, Lord North. Their only son Frederick Douglas sat as Member of Parliament for Banbury between 1812 and his early death in 1819. Lady Glenbervie died in February 1817, aged 56. Glenbervie survived her by six years and died in May 1823, aged 79. As he had no surviving male issue the barony became extinct on his death.

In 1795 he was elected a Fellow of the Royal Society of London and in 1806 elected a Fellow of the Royal Society of Edinburgh, when his proposers were Allan Maconochie, Lord Meadowbank, Gilbert Innes and John Playfair.

References

External links 
 

 

1743 births
1823 deaths
Alumni of the University of Aberdeen
Members of Lincoln's Inn
British diarists
Douglas, Sylvester
Douglas, Sylvester
Douglas, Sylvester
Douglas, Sylvester
Douglas, Sylvester
Members of the Privy Council of Great Britain
Members of the Privy Council of Ireland
Barons in the Peerage of Ireland
Peers of Ireland created by George III
Members of the Parliament of the United Kingdom for Plympton Erle
UK MPs 1801–1802
UK MPs 1802–1806
UK MPs who were granted peerages
Fellows of the Royal Society
Fellows of the Royal Society of Edinburgh
Chief Secretaries for Ireland
Members of the Parliament of Ireland (pre-1801) for County Kilkenny constituencies
Rectors of the University of Aberdeen